Lasiambia is a genus of flies in the family Chloropidae.

References

 Europe
 Nearctic

Oscinellinae
Chloropidae genera
Taxa named by Curtis Williams Sabrosky